National Tertiary Route 602, or just Route 602 (or ) is a National Road Route of Costa Rica, located in the Guanacaste, Puntarenas provinces.

Description
In Guanacaste province the route covers Abangares canton (Las Juntas district).

In Puntarenas province the route covers Puntarenas canton (Manzanillo district).

References

Highways in Costa Rica